RFK Grafičar Beograd (Serbian Cyrillic: РФК Графичар Београд) is a football club based in Senjak, Belgrade, Serbia.

Grafičar has a reputation as an old traditional Belgrade club. Initially, it was financed by the printing industry of major city publishers of books, magazines and newspapers. The club is currently competing in Serbian First League, the second tier of Serbian football. In 2017, Grafičar became affiliated with Red Star Belgrade. As the feeder team, its primary role is developing Red Star's young players.

History
It is located in Belgrade's suburb called Senjak. The club colour is purple (violet), which is why their fans are called Violet Boys.
Some of the club most notable former players are Goran Bunjevčević, Đorđe Svetličić, Dragan Pantelić, Nemanja Vučićević, László Köteles, Milutin Sredojević, Vladimir Rodić. Boris Sekulić who became Slovak international, played in the club in season 2009–10.

Players

First-team squad

Coach
  Milija Žižić (2018–2020)
  Radomir Koković (2021)
  Boško Gjurovski (2021)
  Marko Neđić (2021–present)

References

External links
 Official website

Football clubs in Serbia
Football clubs in Belgrade
Association football clubs established in 1927
Savski Venac